Galatia Township is located in Saline County, Illinois. As of the 2010 census, its population was 1,230 and it contained 592 housing units.

History
Galatia Township is named for Albert Gallatin.

Geography

Demographics

References

External links
City-data.com
Illinois State Archives

Townships in Saline County, Illinois
Townships in Illinois